George Joseph Bell (born 25 September 2002) is an English cricketer who plays for Lancashire County Cricket Club. He is a right-handed batsman and can also play as a wicket keeper.

Early life 
Bell attended Manchester Grammar School and played cricket for Alderley Edge. He played for the Lancashire under-17 team. In September 2020, aged 17, Bell hit a century for England Lions.

Career 
After playing regularly for Lancashire second XI throughout 2021, he signed a contract with the club in November 2021. Bell was named in the England under-19 squad for the 2022 ICC Under-19 Cricket World Cup held in the Caribbean in early 2022. He scored 56 not out in the semi-final in an unbeaten seventh wicket partnership of 95, after coming in to bat with England on 92 for the loss of four wickets. It was his second half century of the tournament.

Bell made his senior debut in June 2022 in the 2022 t20 Blast against Durham at Blackpool, scoring 31 runs from 25 balls. Although Bell had been named in the squad the day before he was unaware that he was playing until arriving at the ground on the day. In August 2022 he made his List A cricket debut for Lancashire against Worcestershire scoring 35 runs, and the following month made his first-class debut against Essex.

References

External links 

Living people
2002 births
English cricketers
Lancashire cricketers
Cricketers from Manchester
People from Alderley Edge
People educated at Manchester Grammar School